André Servier was an historian who lived in French Algeria at the beginning of the 20th century.

Career
He was chief editor of La Dépêche de Constantine, a newspaper from the city of Constantine in northeastern Algeria.
Servier studied well the customs and manners of the North African people, becoming one of the few French intellectuals who studied in depth Ibn Ishaq's Sira. His research included the Ottoman Empire and the Panislamic movement. The latter was developing at that time, along with the rise of nationalist ideals in the Magrebian areas and the Middle East.

Servier saw himself as continuing Louis Bertrand's work, but adapted to the Islamic background.

Thought
Analysing the budding nationalist movements, Servier wrote about the Egyptian Nationalist Party that it: 

A defender of Modernity and European colonization, Servier favored reflective morality against customary morality or authority-enforced puritanism. He had strong opinions about Islam and about the intellectual superiority of European thought and its institutions. He fervently defended the philosophical thought and work of the Western world as a philosophy founded on the idea of freedom and enlightened reason for mankind. Today his works are circulated among critics of Islam.

Quotes

Main works
 Le Nationalisme Musulman en Egypte, en Tunisie, en Algérie : le péril de l'avenir, Constantine, M. Boet. 1913
 L’Islam et la Psychologie du Musulman, Paris, 1923
 Le problème tunisien et la question du peuplement français, 1925

See also
Louis Bertrand
Religious law
Secular ethics

References

External links 
Numerous blogs reproduce chapter by chapter Servier's book L’Islam et la Psychologie du Musulman, translated into English under the title "Islam and the Psychology of the Musulman". (Note : The English version has only 16 chapters, while the French original version has 20)
Entre Europe et Méditerranée : le dialogue culturel en question 
JSTOR: French Anthropology and the Durkheimians in Colonial Indochina

People from Constantine, Algeria
20th-century French historians
French critics of Islam
French political scientists
French sociologists
Pieds-Noirs
Year of birth unknown
Year of death unknown
French male writers